The Land Remote-Sensing Commercialization Act of 1984 is a United States statute establishing a system to further the utilization of satellite imagery data obtained from Earth observation satellites located in a geocentric orbit above the atmosphere of Earth.

The H.R. 5155 legislation was passed by the 98th U.S. Congressional session and enacted into law by the 40th President of the United States Ronald Reagan on July 17, 1984.

Titles of the Act
Title 15 United States Code Chapter 68 was authored as seven titles based on U.S. Congressional findings, policies, and purposes as in accordance with the existing Landsat program and Space law.

Title I: Declaration of Findings, Purposes, and Policies - 15 U.S.C. §§ 4201-4204
Title II: Operation and Data Marketing of Landsat System - 15 U.S.C. §§ 4211-4215
Title III: Provision of Data Continuity after the Landsat System - 15 U.S.C. §§ 4221-4227
Title IV: Licensing of Private Remote-Sensing Space Systems - 15 U.S.C. §§ 4241-4246
Title V: Research and Development - 15 U.S.C. §§ 4261-4263
Title VI: General Provisions - 15 U.S.C. §§ 4271-4278
Title VII: Prohibition of Commercialization of Weather Satellites - 15 U.S.C. §§ 4291-4292

U.S. Congressional Actions to 1984 Act
U.S. Congressional amendment and fiscal authorization to the Land Remote-Sensing Commercialization Act of 1984.

Repeal of Land Remote-Sensing Commercialization Act of 1984
The Land Remote-Sensing Commercialization Act was repealed by the enactment of the Land Remote Sensing Policy Act of 1992. The legislative repeal was passed by the 102nd U.S. Congressional session and enacted into law by the 41st President of the United States George H.W. Bush on October 28, 1992.

See also
Center for Earth Resources Observation and Science
Commercial use of space
Copernicus Programme
Earth Observing System
Ocean Surface Topography Mission
Satellite crop monitoring

References

External links
 
 

1984 in law
98th United States Congress
Presidency of Ronald Reagan
1984
United States federal legislation
Remote sensing